Cristina Grigoras may refer to:

 Cristina Elena Grigoraş, Romanian artistic gymnast
 Cristina Grigoraș, Romanian rower